This article lists political parties in Jordan. Jordan has 34 different political parties, but apart from the oppositional Islamic Action Front and neutral Jordanian National Youth Party, none of them play a real role because of lack of organization and clear political platforms.

The role of parties is significantly limited by institutional factors as well. The king is vested with somewhat broader executive power than is usually the case for a constitutional monarch, making it difficult for a party to win control of the government solely at the ballot box. Additionally, the electoral system is significantly malapportioned in favour of rural areas.

There is no clear picture on the political parties in Jordan, but sources mention the following parties.

The parties

See also
 List of ruling political parties by country
 Politics of Jordan

References

External links 
  Jordan's political parties from Arab Decision website
  The same page in English
 Ministry of Interior - Political Parties

Jordan
 
Political parties
Political parties
Jordan